Condylocarpon is a genus of flowering plants in the family Apocynaceae first described as a genus in 1822. It is primarily native to South America, though found also in Trinidad & Tobago and Nicaragua.

Species
 Condylocarpon amazonicum (Markgr.) Ducke - Suriname, Venezuela, Bolivia, NW Brazil
 †Condylocarpon glabrum Müll.Arg.  - Espírito Santo in Brazil but extinct
 Condylocarpon guyanense Desf. - French Guiana, Guyana, Amapá
 Condylocarpon intermedium Müll.Arg. - Nicaragua, Trinidad & Tobago, Venezuela, the Guianas, N Brazil
 Condylocarpon isthmicum (Vell.) A.DC. - Brazil, Paraguay, Uruguay, NE Argentina
 Condylocarpon myrtifolium (Miq.) Müll.Arg. - Venezuela, Bolivia, NW Brazil, the Guianas
 Condylocarpon pubiflorum Müll.Arg. - Venezuela, Colombia, Peru, NW Brazil

References

Apocynaceae genera
Rauvolfioideae
Taxa named by René Louiche Desfontaines